Brachyurophis campbelli, also known as the Cape York shovel-nosed snake or Einasliegh shovel-nosed snake, is a species of venomous burrowing snake that is endemic to Australia. The specific epithet campbelli honours a Mr W.D. Campbell who collected the type specimen in 1928 in the vicinity of Almaden, Queensland.

Description
The species grows to an average of about 40 cm in length. There are dark brown to black bands along the length of the orange to reddish-brown body, the dark bands similar in width to the spaces separating them. The belly is whitish.

Behaviour
The species is oviparous. It is presumed to feed on reptile eggs.

Distribution and habitat
The species occurs in northern Queensland, including the Cape York Peninsula, its range extending as far south as Longreach, in woodland habitats.

References

 
campbelli
Snakes of Australia
Endemic fauna of Australia
Reptiles of Queensland
Taxa named by James Roy Kinghorn
Reptiles described in 1929